Paartha Gnabagam Illayo was an Indian Tamil-language soap opera starring Kushboo Sundar, Seenu, Delhi Kumar, Dr. Sharmila, Mercury Sathya and Bharath Kalyan. It aired on Kalaignar TV from 5 March 2012 to 31 July 2014 on Monday through Thursday at 21:30PM (IST) and The show was shifted to 20:30PM (IST) time Slot for 472 Episodes. The show was produced by Avni Telemedia and director by N.Priyan. The Family series received positive feedback from viewers and was a huge hit.

Cast

Main cast
 Kushboo Sundar as Oviya
 "Tamil Padam" Seenu as Karthik
 Delhi Kumar

Additional cast

 Dr. Sharmila
 Mercury Sathya
 Bharath Kalyan 
 Sobhana
 T.R.Latha
 Rajya Lakshmi
 Ravikhirushna
 Sudha
 V.K.R.Raku
 Kavyavarshini
 Vijesh
 Harish Athithya
 Sruthi Retty
 Savithri Rajiv
 Sathiya
 Vaasu
 Muthukumar
 Sangeetha
 Astritha
 Varnika priyan
 Shwetha
 N.S. Madheswaran
 Viswanathan
 Muthukumar
 S. Vasu
 K. Natraj
 Ajay Siva
 Nithya Ravindran
 K.S. Muthukumar
Minnal Deepa

Music 
The title track was composed by C. Sathya while the lyrics were written by Pa. Vijay and sung by Mathangi Jagdish and M. L. R. Karthikeyan.

Soundtrack

International broadcast
The Series was released on 5 March 2012 on Kalaignar TV. The Show was also broadcast internationally on Channel's international distribution. It airs in Sri Lanka, Singapore, Malaysia, South East Asia, Middle East, Oceania, South Africa and Sub Saharan Africa on Kalaignar TV and also airs in United States, Canada, Europe on Kalaignar Ayngaran TV.

 This serial re-telecast on same Channel only on Singapore and Malaysia from December 2016, aired Monday to Friday at 6:30PM.

References

External links
 

Kalaignar TV television series
2012 Tamil-language television series debuts
Tamil-language television shows
2014 Tamil-language television series endings